Adam Hollanek (born 4 October 1922 in Lwów, died 28 July 1998 in Zakopane) was a Polish science fiction writer and journalist, and founder of the Fantastyka magazine, the first science-fiction-oriented monthly magazine in the whole Eastern Bloc, established in 1982. He was Fantastyka's editor-in-chief between 1982 and 1990, and published regular essays in the magazine until his death in 1998.

Honours
Polish Academy of Sciences Award (1978)
Prix Européen de Science Fiction (1986)
Special World SF Prof. Organisation President's Award (1987)

Works

Novels
Katastrofa na "Słońcu Antarktydy" (1958)
Zbrodnia wielkiego człowieka (1960)
Muzyka dla was, chłopcy (1975)
Jeszcze trochę pożyć (1980)
Olśnienie (1982)
Kochać bez skóry (1983)
Ja z Łyczakowa
 Księżna z Florencji (1988)
 Pacałycha – (1996)
 Mudrahela: Tragiczna opowiesc lwowska (1997)

Short story collections
 Plaża w Europie (1967)
Ukochany z Księżyca (1979; short stories:  Ukochany z Księżyca, Jak koń trojański, Punkt, Aparat też chce żyć, Oni już tu są, Łazarzu wstań)
 Bandyci i policjanci (1982)
 Skasować drugie ja (1989; short stories Każdy może być Faustem, Skasować drugie ja, Jak koń trojański, Nie można go spalić, Muzyka dla was, chłopcy)

Popular science books
Węgiel nasze czarne złoto (1954)
Niewidzialne armie kapitulują (1954)
Sprzedam śmierć (1961)
Skóra jaszczurcza (1965)
Lewooki cyklop (1966)
Nieśmiertelność na zamówienie (1973)
Sposób na niewiadome (1978)

Essays
 Geniusz na miarę epoki ("Fantastyka" 3/86)
 A jednak romantyzm ("Fantastyka" 2/88)

Poetry
 Pokuty (1987)
 Ja - kon, ja Zyd (1995)
 Landszafty (1996)

1922 births
1998 deaths
Polish science fiction writers
Science fiction editors